Maïna is a Canadian drama film, released in 2013. Directed by Michel Poulette, an adaptation of Dominique Demers' novel, the film stars Roseanne Supernault.

Plot
Maïna, Innu chief Mishtenapuu's daughter, embarks on a quest into Inuit territory to rescue Nipki, a young boy from her community captured by the Inuit following a battle.

Cast
The film's cast includes Graham Greene as Maïna's father as well as Tantoo Cardinal, Eric Schweig and Natar Ungalaaq.

Roseanne Supernault as Maïna
Ipellie Ootoova as Natak
Uapeshkuss Thernish as Nipki
Graham Greene as Mishtenapeu
Tantoo Cardinal as Tekahera
Eric Schweig as Quujuuq
Natar Ungalaaq as Tadio
Flint Eagle as Saito

Accolades
The film was named Best Picture at the 2013 American Indian Film Festival, and Supernault was named Best Actress. The film also garnered six Canadian Screen Award nominations at the 2nd Canadian Screen Awards, including Best Picture, Best Art Direction/Production Design, Best Cinematography (Allen Smith), Best Costume Design, Best Original Score and Best Make-Up.

References

External links
 

2013 films
2013 drama films
Canadian drama films
First Nations films
Inuktitut-language films
Films directed by Michel Poulette
Films about Inuit in Canada
2010s Canadian films